John Walter "Baddie" Badaczewski (January 27, 1922 – December 12, 1999) was an American football offensive lineman in the National Football League for the Boston Yanks, Chicago Cardinals, Washington Redskins, and the Chicago Bears.  He played college football at Western Reserve University (now known as Case Western Reserve University). He sacked opposing quarterbacks 22 times in the year 1946 alone.

References

External links
 

1922 births
1999 deaths
American football offensive linemen
Boston Yanks players
Case Western Spartans football players
Chicago Bears players
Chicago Cardinals players
Great Lakes Navy Bluejackets football players
Washington Redskins players
United States Navy personnel of World War II